Henry Esson Young (February 24, 1862 – October 24, 1939) was a physician and political figure in British Columbia. Some sources list his birth year as 1867. He represented Atlin in the Legislative Assembly of British Columbia from 1903 to 1915 as a Conservative.

He was born in English River, Quebec in 1862, the son of Reverend Alexander Young and Ellen (née McBain), and was educated at Queen's University, McGill University, Toronto University and University of Pennsylvania. He then continued his post-graduate studies in England. Young moved to Atlin, British Columbia, where he practised medicine from 1901 to 1903. In 1904, he married Rosalind Watson. Young served in the provincial cabinet as Minister of Education and Provincial Secretary. He helped establish the University of British Columbia in 1908. Young served as Secretary of the Provincial Board of Health from 1915 until his death in 1939 at Victoria at the age of 77.

The neighbourhood of Essondale was named in his honour. At one time, Riverview Hospital in Coquitlam was known as Essondale Hospital; Young played an important role in establishing the facility.

References 

1862 births
1939 deaths
Canadian physicians
British Columbia Conservative Party MLAs
McGill University alumni